Alfonso Álvarez Miranda (2 July 1915 – 30 November 2003) was a Spanish politician who served as Minister of Industry of Spain in 1975, during the Francoist dictatorship.

References

1915 births
2003 deaths
Industry ministers of Spain
Government ministers during the Francoist dictatorship